Kurla (formerly Coorla, station code: C) is a railway station on the Central and Harbour lines of the Mumbai Suburban Railway network. It is among the oldest railway stations in India, it being part of the original 21 mile (33.8 km) Great Indian Peninsula Railway (GIPR) section between Bombay (Mumbai) and Tannah (Thane) that opened in 1853.

Local trains terminating at Kurla began operating by 1879, a suburban terminus was built in 1913 and the line was quadrupled in 1915. A single line between Kurla and Chembur that had been laid for garbage clearance in 1906 was opened for suburban traffic in 1924. The service was operated by steam locomotives until the line was electrified in 1950.

It was named so because it catered to the eastern neighbourhoods along the city's natural harbour. The country's first EMU rakes, manufactured by English Electric Company, were introduced between Bombay VT & Kurla on the Harbour line in 1925.

Kurla is having eight operational platforms for the suburban local railway. Platform 1, 1A and 4 serve 'Slow' local trains. Platform 1A formerly served the Salsette–Trombay Railway. Platforms 2 and 3 are dedicated to trains originating and terminating at Kurla. Platforms 5 and 6 are used by 'Fast' local trains, while platforms 7 and 8 serve the Harbour line local trains. Platforms 9 and 10, which were originally used to terminate trains coming UP from Vashi were abandoned in the early 2000s. Prior to the opening of the railway line to Navi Mumbai, these two platforms were used by shuttle trains till .

Gallery

References

Railway stations in Mumbai Suburban district
Mumbai Suburban Railway stations
Mumbai CR railway division